The Sharp PC-E500S was a 1995 pocket computer by Sharp Corporation and was the successor to the 1989 PC-E500 model, featuring a 2.304 MHz CMOS CPU.

Description 
It was slightly wider, and the keys are slightly larger than the previous model. The display had more contrast, and the keyboard cover is a (removable) hinged lid (clamshell) instead of plastic slipcase. There were also four additional BASIC commands (Multiline IF ... ENDIF, WHILE ... WEND, REPEAT ... UNTIL, SWITCH ... CASE ... ENDSWITCH)

It came with 32 KB of RAM which could be upgraded to 96 KB using memory expansion cards. The monochrome LCD had 240×32 pixels which could display four lines with 40 characters per line as well as graphics. The 256 KB system ROM the contained the BIOS, a diagnostic suite, and the BASIC interpreter used to program the device.

An algebraic calculation system was included. The Algebraic Expression Reserve (AER) memory: Frequently used formulas or constants could be stored in memory and recalled for repeated use. The PC-E500 series also performed as a scientific calculator when switched into 'CAL' mode.

It also included an X<>Y exchange key for working with complex numbers and polar to rectangular conversions.

Applications 
 Mathematics (integers, equations, differential & integral calculus, formulas and graphs)
 Physics
 Earth sciences
 Meteorology
 Chemistry
 Biology
 Geology
 Electrical engineering
 Mechanical engineering
In addition things like amino acids and the periodic table of elements were available. These built-in programs were accessed through a menu system and special function keys. There was also a built-in menu editor to add new software to the menus or indeed replace some built-in software or formulas.

Operating modes 
 BASIC (programming and execution)
 CAL (scientific calculator)
 MATRIX (matrices calculations)
 STAT (statistics)
 ENG (engineering)
 AER (algebraic expressions editor). This mode can be accessed from the second main menu page (press up/down arrow near the lower left display corner).

Accuracy 
 10 digits (mantissa) + 2 digits (exponent) in single-precision mode.
 20 digits (mantissa) + 2 digits (exponent) in double-precision mode.
 In the CAL, MATRIX and STAT modes, only the single precision mode can be used.

Memory expansion 
The Sharp PC-E500 series could store data and programs on memory expansion cards as well as the main RAM. Six cards were available:
 CE-210M: 2 KB
 CE-211M: 4 KB
 CE-212M: 8 KB
 CE-2H16M: 16 KB
 CE-2H32M: 32 KB
 CE-2H64M: 64 KB
These cards used a CR1616 lithium battery for memory backup.

The memory configuration was software-switchable from the command-line. The RAM card could be appended to the system memory, replace the system memory or act as a separate space to be used as a RAM drive (F:). The main memory could also be partitioned off to a RAM drive (E:).

Peripherals 

 : Thermal printer & cassette interface.
 CE-140F: 2.5-inch pocket floppy drive.
 CE-130T: RS-232 adaptor level converter.
 CE-135T: RS-232 adaptor level converter. (Macintosh)
 CE-515: 4-color X/Y plotter printer
The PC-E500S had a weight of 340 g (with batteries) and was powered by four AAA batteries. It could, given its power consumption of 0.09 W, be used for about 70 hours on a charge.

Variants 

 PC-E500 (English): 32 KB, engineer software, double precision, slipcase, rubber keys, black, 1988/1989
 PC-E500 (Japanese): 32 KB, engineer software, double precision, Kanji, slipcase, rubber keys, black, 1988
 PC-E500PJ / PC-E500-BL (Japanese): 32 KB, engineer software, game "HEAVY METAL mini" (by CRISIS Software) preloaded into RAM, double precision, Kanji, slipcase, rubber keys, blue, 1990, limited special edition by Pokecom Journal (PJ)
 PC-E500S (English): 32 KB, engineer software, double precision, high contrast display, clamshell, plastic keys, black, 1995
 PC-E550 (Japanese): 64 KB, engineer software, double precision, Kanji, slipcase, rubber keys, white, 1990
 PC-E650 (Japanese): 64 KB, engineer software, double precision, structured BASIC, Kanji, clamshell, plastic keys, black, 1993
 PC-1480U (Japanese): 32 KB, no engineer software, "coop uni" label, double precision, Kanji, slipcase, rubber keys, black, 1988
 PC-1490U (Japanese): 32 KB, no engineer software, "coop uni" label, double precision, Kanji, slipcase, rubber keys, black, 1990
 PC-1490UII (Japanese): 64 KB, no engineer software, "UNIV. TOOL" label, double precision, Kanji, slipcase, rubber keys?, black, 1991
 PC-U6000 (Japanese): 64 KB, no engineer software, "UNIV. TOOL" label, double precision, Kanji, clamshell, plastic keys, black, 1993

See also 
 Sharp pocket computer character sets

References

External links 

 —demo of a Japanese PC-E500

PC-E500S
PC-E500S